The Sri Lanka Sustainable Energy Authority (or SLSEA) is the primary body responsible for the issuance of licenses for sustainable energy developments in Sri Lanka. In addition to being the key licence provider, it is also the organization responsible for promoting renewable energy and sustainable developments in the country.

See also 
 Ceylon Electricity Board
 Electricity in Sri Lanka
 List of dams and reservoirs in Sri Lanka
 List of power stations in Sri Lanka

References 

Electric power in Sri Lanka
Government agencies of Sri Lanka
Sustainable energy
Energy regulatory authorities
Regulation in Sri Lanka